Norbert Sedlacek Koch is an Austrian adventurer and offshore sailor born on 27 January 1962 in Vienna.

Biography
This former tram driver and taekwondo champion has been devoted entirely to sailing since 1996.

Sailing Challenges

1996-1998 - First Circumnavigation
Between 1996 and 1998 in just under 2 years he completed a solo single-handed circumnavigation starting from the Italian Port of Grado covering approximately 26,000 nautical miles. The voyage was completed on a small 8.4m sloop designed by himself called Wolf 766. He was the first Austrian sailor to sailed around the world.

2000 Antarctic Ice Limit Circumnavigation
In November 2000 he started a solo non-stop around Antarctica circumnavigation from Cape Town to Cape Town. He completed the voyage in 93 days covering 14315 nm through the most dangerous oceans full of icebergs.

2004 and 2008 Vendee Globe Race
He took part in the pinnacle solo none stop round the world race the in the 2004-2005 Vendée Globe edition, he had to abandon due to keel problems. He returned for the next edition 2008-2009 Vendée Globe finished 11th and last but it should be noted thirty competitors started the grueling race. In order to gain experience on his IMOCA 60 class boat he came 10 out of 17 finisher in the Transat 2004 from Plymouth (GB) to Boston (USA).

Further Sailing Challenged
In 2013 he attempted to cross the Atlantic on a smallest boat made of recycled materials.

In 2021 he plans to start a 34000 nautical mile odyssey "ANT ARCTIC LAB" project which involved being the first to attempt to sail nonstop, single-handed and without assistance around the world through all five oceans, including Arctic and Southern Ocean.<ref>

References

External links
 Official Website 
 Official Facebook Page 
 Official YouTube

1962 births
Living people
People from Vienna
Sportspeople from Vienna
Austrian male sailors (sport)
IMOCA 60 class sailors
Austrian Vendee Globe sailors
2004 Vendee Globe sailors
2008 Vendee Globe sailors
Vendée Globe finishers
Single-handed circumnavigating sailors